Etanidazole is a nitroimidazole drug that was investigated in clinical trials for its radiosensitizing properties in cancer treatment. Administration of etanidazole results in a decrease of glutathione concentration and inhibits glutathione S-transferase.  The result is that tissues become more sensitive to the ionizing radiation.

See also
 18F-EF5, a related nitroimidazole
 Misonidazole

References

Nitroimidazoles